Leucopogon ovalifolius is a species of flowering plant in the heath family Ericaceae and is endemic to the south-west of Western Australia. The flowers are arranged in pairs or threes in leaf axils on a short peduncle with tiny bracts, and bracteoles less than half as long as the sepals.

The species was first formally described in 1845 by Otto Wilhelm Sonder in Lehmann's Plantae Preissianae from specimens collected in 1840. The specific epithet (ovalifolius) means "oval-leaved".

Leucopogon ovalifolius occurs in the Avon Wheatbelt, Geraldton Sandplains, Jarrah Forest and Swan Coastal Plain bioregions of southern Western Australia and is listed (as Styphelia retrorsa) as "not threatened" by the Western Australian Government Department of Biodiversity, Conservation and Attractions.

References

ovalifolius
Ericales of Australia
Flora of Western Australia
Plants described in 1845
Taxa named by Otto Wilhelm Sonder